Otto Karl Josef Zdansky (28 November 1894, Vienna – 26 December 1988, Uppsala) was an Austrian paleontologist.

Biography 
He graduated from the Philosophical School at the University of Vienna in Paleontology on March 21, 1921, with the academic degree 'Dr. phil.' (dissertation: 'Über die Temporalregion des Schildkrötenschädels').

He is best known for his work in China, where he, as an assistant to Johan Gunnar Andersson, discovered a fossil tooth of the Peking Man in 1921 at the Dragon Bone Hill, although he did not disclose it until 1926  when he published it in Nature after an analysis by Davidson Black.
He is also famous for his excavations of mammal fossils in Baode County area (Pao Te Hsien), Shanxi Province. Zdansky in 1923 excavated the sauropod dinosaur Euhelopus zdanskyi named after him.

References

Further reading
 

1894 births
1984 deaths
Austrian paleontologists
Austrian people of Polish descent
Austrian emigrants to Sweden